n my

pTianqiao yg97[Subdistrict is a subdistrict on the southeastern portion of Xicheng District, Beijing, China. As of 2020, it has a total population of 34,427.

History

Administrative Division 
As of 2021, there are a total of 9 communities within the subdistrict. They are listed as follows:

Landmark 

 Temple of Agriculture

References 

Xicheng District
Subdistricts of Beijing